The National Museum of Art, Palacio Diez de Medina is a museum in the city of La Paz, Bolivia. It has an important permanent collection of colonial paintings, including canvases by Melchor Pérez de Holguín, a painter 16th century and those of Gregorio Gamarra, a 17th-century painter.

Location
The museum is located right in front of the main square of the city of La Paz, Plaza Murillo, specifically at the intersection of the pedestrian promenade Calle Comercio and Calle Socabaya.

History

This building was the residence of the then Mayor Don Francisco Tadeo Diez de Medina y Vidango. Later it became the property of the Counts of Arana, subsequently during the La Paz revolution it became the property of the Marquises of Villaverde. At the end of the 19th century they functioned as the famous Gisbert hotel. In the year 1964, the palace was adapted to house the National Museum of Art of Bolivia, preserving its two courtyards and three levels. The main entrance is located on Socabaya Street.

Architecture

The entrance shows a stone façade carved and decorated with baroque motifs that spanned the three levels of the building. At the meeting of Socabaya and Comercio streets, the corner stone column and the stone balcony stand out.

Collections

Colonial and republican art
Some of the key painting in the collection include the following:

 Virgin of Fuencisla, 1723
 Virgin of the Hill, 1720
 Coronation of the Virgin by the Trinity and the Saints, 18th century
 Child Jesus with symbols of the Passion, Gregorio Gamarra
 Coronation of the Virgin, Gaspar Miguel de Berrío.

Contemporary art

The museum also has Bolivian, Latin American and international contemporary art in its collections such as those of Spanish artist Javier de Villota.

Selected works

See also

 List of museums in Bolivia

References

Museums in La Paz